Igarapava is a municipality in the state of São Paulo in Brazil. The population is 30,614 (2020 est.) in an area of 468 km². It is the hometown of the Música popular brasileira (MPB) singer Jair Rodrigues.

References

Municipalities in São Paulo (state)